David Hill was a Scottish footballer who played as a winger.

Career
Hill played club football for Rangers, and made three appearances for Scotland. He had been a founder member of Rangers.

References

Year of birth missing
Place of birth missing
Scottish footballers
Scotland international footballers
Rangers F.C. players
Association football wingers
Year of death missing
Place of death missing